Edas Butvilas (born 23 July 2004) is a Lithuanian tennis player.

Butvilas has a career high ITF junior combined ranking of 24 achieved on 19 July 2021.

Butvilas won the 2021 Wimbledon Championships – Boys' doubles title partnering Alejandro Manzanera Pertusa and the 2022 French Open – Boys' doubles title partnering Mili Poljičak.

ATP Challenger and ITF Futures finals

Singles: 1 (1–0)

Junior Grand Slam finals

Doubles: 2 (2 titles)

References

External links
 
 
 

2004 births
Living people
Lithuanian male tennis players
French Open junior champions
Wimbledon junior champions
Grand Slam (tennis) champions in boys' doubles
21st-century Lithuanian people